WKXU may refer to:

 WKXU (FM), a radio station (102.5 FM) licensed to Hillsborough, North Carolina
 WYMY, a radio station (101.1 FM) licensed to Burlington, North Carolina, that that used the call sign WKXU from 1998 to 2004